Blera scitula, the Western Wood Fly, is an uncommon  species of syrphid fly first officially described by Williston in 1882. Hoverflies get their names from the ability to remain nearly motionless while in flight. The adults are also known as flower flies, for they are commonly found around and on the flowers from which they get both energy-giving nectar and protein-rich pollen. The larvae of Blera are of the rat-tailed type, feeding on exuding sap or in the rot holes of trees.

Distribution
This is a Nearctic species found on the western coastal area of North America.
External image

Description
For terms see Morphology of Diptera.
External images 
Size 10 to 13 mm. 
Head
The  frontal  triangle is opaque yellow, The vertical triangle is black, with black pile.  In the female the frons  is moderately narrowed above and yellow on the  lower fourth, shining greenish black elsewhere except thinly reddish pollinose in  front of the ocelli. The pile is black. The pile is longer on the ocellar triangle and is  yellow at the  vertex.  The face is yellow, with yellow pollen and a prominent rounded tubercle in the middle. The gena are shining black. The antennae are red with the flagellum obscurely brownish above. The arista is brown. The frontal prominence is yellow with side margins and the lower  sides with sparse, short yellowish pile. The eyes are  contiguous Holoptic in the male. The occiput  is greyish yellow pollinose, with bright yellow pile.
Thorax
The dorsum of thorax (scutum) is aeneous with pile bright yellow before the transverse suture, on the narrow lateral margins and immediately in front of the scutellum. The humeri (postpronotum) and border of the scutum are yellow. The area on the disc behind the suture is black.  In the female there is a patch of  black pile before the ends of the thoracic suture and the scutellum  is aeneous with long, bright yellow pile, but there are some black hairs on the disc. 
Abdomen
The abdomen is black with bold yellow spots. The  second segment has a pair of large yellow spots, rounded  interiorly and directed forward laterally so that they touch the anterior margin towards the sides. The third segment has a broad, complete  basal yellow band (fascia) occupying at least half, sometimes four-fifths the length of the  segment on each side of the median notch, considerably or moderately narrowed towards the sides, never going over the side margins in more than half  the length of the segment, sometimes only narrowly at the anterior angles. The fourth segment is variable, sometimes all black, but most frequently with a triangular spot on the anterior angles and a pair of narrowly separated triangular spots in the middle at the base reddish yellow.   Sometimes all of these markings may be more or less fused with the central black stripe (vitta)  usually distinct. The fifth abdominal segment  is yellowish basally, more broadly so in the middle. The pile slightly shorter throughout. In the female the abdominal bands are narrower, the second and third segments are usually narrowly interrupted in the middle, fifth segment is  yellowish basally, more broadly so in the middle and the pile is slightly shorter throughout. 
The hypopygium usually reddish. 
Genitalia 
The genitalia were described by Metcalf in 1921 
Wings
The wings are cinereous hyaline, somewhat yellowish on the basal portion anteriorly. The squamae Calypter are white, with a yellow border and fringe. The halteres (#9) are yellow. The  vein R4+5 is almost straight and joins the costa just before the tip of the wing. The first posterior cell r4+5 is acute apically and  extends almost to the wing margin before the tip.

References

Eristalinae
Insects described in 1882
Diptera of North America

Hoverflies of North America
Taxa named by Samuel Wendell Williston